Lilas Desquiron (born 1946) is a Haitian-born writer and ethnologist. From 2001 to 2004, she served as Minister of Culture and Communications in the government of Jean-Bertrand Aristide.

She was born in Port-au-Prince; her family came from Jérémie. From 1966 to 1970, she studied ethnology in Brussels and Paris, specializing in Afro-American religions. She later returned to France.

Works 
 Racines de voudou, essay (1990)
 Les chemins de Loco-Miroir, novel (1990), translated into English as Reflections of Loko Miwa (1998)

References 

1946 births
Living people
20th-century Haitian novelists
Government ministers of Haiti
Haitian expatriates in France
People from Port-au-Prince
Women government ministers of Haiti
Haitian women novelists
20th-century Haitian women writers
21st-century Haitian women politicians
21st-century Haitian politicians